The International Journal of Hindu Studies is a peer-reviewed academic journal published by Springer Science+Business Media. The editor-in-chief is Sushil Mittal (James Madison University). The journal was established in 1997 and appears triannually (except from 2003-2005, when it was published once per year, and 2010, when only two issues appeared).

Scope
The journal covers all aspects of Hindu studies ranging from well-established topics to fostering new work in neglected areas. The Journal supports critical inquiries, hermeneutical interpretive proposals, and historical investigations into all aspects of Hindu traditions. Comparative and theoretical articles span a broad range of disciplines in the humanities and social sciences.

Abstracting and indexing 
The journal is abstracted and indexed in Scopus, EBSCO databases, Academic OneFile, Arts & Humanities Citation Index, ATLA Religion Database, Humanities Abstracts, Humanities Index, and OmniFile.

References

External links 
 

Springer Science+Business Media academic journals
Triannual journals
Publications established in 1997
English-language journals
Hindu studies journals
Hindu literature